{{Automatic taxobox
| taxon = Colidae
| image = 
| image_caption = 
| authority = Gray, 1857
| synonyms_ref = 
| synonyms = Colinae Gray, 1857 
| type_genus= '
| type_genus_authority = 
| subdivision_ranks = Genera
| subdivision = See text
|display_parents= 3
}}

The Colidae are a  taxonomic family of large sea snails, belonging to the superfamily Buccinoidea. 

Genera
 Colus Röding, 1798
 Kryptos Dautzenberg & H. Fischer, 1896
 Turrisipho Dautzenberg & H. Fischer, 1912
Synonyms
 Atractus Agassiz, 1839: synonym of Colus Röding, 1798 (invalid: junior homonym of Atractus Wagler, 1828 [Reptilia]; also junior objective synonym of Colus)
 Colicryptus Iredale, 1918: synonym of Turrisipho Dautzenberg & H. Fischer, 1912
 Sipho Mörch, 1852: synonym of Colus Röding, 1798
 Siphonorbis Mörch, 1869: synonym of Colus Röding, 1798
 Tritonofusus Beck, 1847: synonym of Colus'' Röding, 1798 (junior objective synonym of Colus)

References

External links
 Gray, J. E. (1857). Guide to the systematic distribution of Mollusca in the British Museum. Part I. (Gastropoda). British Museum, London, xii + 230 pp.
 Kantor, Y.I., Fedosov, A.E., Kosyan, A.R., Puillandre, N., Sorokin, P.A., Kano, Y., Clark, R. N. & Bouchet, P. (2022 [nomenclatural availability: 2021). Molecular phylogeny and revised classification of the Buccinoidea (Neogastropoda). Zoological Journal of the Linnean Society. 194: 789-857.]

Buccinoidea